Drozdetsky is a Russian masculine surname, its feminine counterpart is Drozdetskaya. It may refer to
Alexander Drozdetsky (born 1981), Russian ice hockey player
Nikolai Drozdetsky (1957–1995), Russian ice hockey player, father of Alexander

Russian-language surnames